Fähnrich (short: Fähnr / in lists: FR) was a military rank in the National People's Army (NPA) of the German Democratic Republic (GDR) including the GDR Volksmarine and Border troops, from 1973 to 1990. The minimum service time to this particular type of military specialist was 15 years.

The official manner, in line to NPA Handboock, of formal addressing of military people with the rank Fähnrich was Genosse/Genossin Fähnrich (en: comrade Fähnrich).

Introduction
In line to Minister Order Nr. 168/73, Fähnrich was introduced as new autonomous career group, and rank to the Army, Volksmarine, and the GDR Border troops in 1973. The position of that career group might be compared to the Warrant Officer (WO) rank group in the US-Army. It derives from German Fahne, "flag", and so has means "flag carrier, bannerman."

In 1979 three extra Fähnrich ranks were established (Oberfähnrich, Stabsfähnrich, and Stabsoberfähnrich). With that decision Fähnrich became finally the lowest rank of the Fähnrich rank group, located between commissioned officer (CO) and noncommissioned officer (NCO) ranks.

With that concept the NPA administration followed the Soviet military doctrine, who introduced to the Soviet Army the praporshchik (ru: пра́порщик) rank in 1972, along with the michman (ru: ми́чман; "midshipman") rank in the Soviet Navy. Most other Warsaw Pact countries followed this approach. However, these countries used historical rank designations in order to pursue national military traditions.

Fähnrich ranks were also used in the GDR States security (de: DDR Staatssicherheit - Stasi), and GDR Civil defence (de: Zivilverteidigung der DDR - ZV) as well.

Training
The Fähnrichkorps, was supposed to provide highly specialized "long service members" below the officer level and close a skills gap in the technical careers. For Fähnriche of the NVA a specialized technical education was aimed for.

First advanced senior NCOs, usually in the rank of Stabsfeldwebel, were promoted to the rank of Fähnrich, even without them having a specialist technical college qualification. This allowed them to retain specialists who would otherwise have retired after their ten years of service.

Later, only Fähnrichschüler could be appointed Fähnrich if they had successfully completed a two-year training course at a military technical school or an Offiziershochschulen of the GDR. During this training, the soldiers wore Fähnrichschüler ranks that corresponded to their service branch.

Warsaw Pact countries with similar rank designation
On recommendation of the Soviet Union this new rank group was introduced to the so-called brotherly armed forces in most Warsaw Pact countries. However, slight deviations in comparison to the Russian rank designation praporshchik and michman were welcomed, in order to underline national traditions.

 Czechoslovakia ⇒ Praporčík or also Poddůstojník
 Hungary ⇒ Zászlós
 Poland ⇒ Chorąży / Chorąży marynarki
 Romania ⇒ Meistru militar principal (Military master class IV, III, II, I and Senior-military-master)
 Soviet Union ⇒  Прапорщик (Praporshchik) / мичман (michman)

NPA Fähnrich rank insignia 1979-1990 

⇒ see main article Ranks of the National People's Army
⇒ see main article Corps colours (NPA)

See also 
 Ranks of the National People's Army
 Glossary of German military terms

References 

Military of East Germany
Military ranks of Germany